This is a list of algorithm general topics.

 Analysis of algorithms
 Ant colony algorithm
 Approximation algorithm
 Best and worst cases
 Big O notation
 Combinatorial search
 Competitive analysis
 Computability theory
 Computational complexity theory
 Embarrassingly parallel problem
 Emergent algorithm
 Evolutionary algorithm
 Fast Fourier transform
 Genetic algorithm
 Graph exploration algorithm
 Heuristic
 Hill climbing
 Implementation
 Las Vegas algorithm
 Lock-free and wait-free algorithms
 Monte Carlo algorithm
 Numerical analysis
 Online algorithm
 Polynomial time approximation scheme
 Problem size
 Pseudorandom number generator
 Quantum algorithm
 Random-restart hill climbing
 Randomized algorithm
 Running time
 Sorting algorithm
 Search algorithm
 Stable algorithm (disambiguation)
 Super-recursive algorithm
 Tree search algorithm

See also
 List of algorithms for specific algorithms
 List of computability and complexity topics for more abstract theory
 List of complexity classes, complexity class
 List of data structures.

Mathematics-related lists